Point-No-Point Bridge is a railroad bridge crossing the Passaic River between Newark and Kearny, New Jersey, United States, in the New Jersey Meadowlands. A camelback through truss bridge, it is owned by Conrail as part of its North Jersey Shared Assets and carries the Passaic and Harsimus Line used by CSX Transportation and Norfolk Southern. River Subdivision (CSX Transportation) accesses the line via Marion Junction. Conrail is considering replacing the bridge, which was opened in 1901.

A crossing of the Passaic at Point-No-Point was originally built by the Pennsylvania Railroad (PRR) in the early 1890s to bypass its mainline and thus shorten the distance to its rail yard at Harsimus Cove. At the time the railroad crossed the Passaic at the Centre Street Bridge (no longer in existence) near its Newark station, at the site of today's New Jersey Performing Arts Center. The new Pennsylvania Cut-off diverged from the line (now today's Northeast Corridor) at Waverly Yard, crossed the Newark Ironbound and the Passaic to the Kearny Meadows and then crossed the Hackensack River on the Harsimus Branch Lift Bridge. It rejoined the main line at the Bergen Hill Cut, but diverged again using the Harsimus Stem Embankment to reach its freight yards on the Hudson River waterfront north of its passenger terminal at Exchange Place. The PRR also used the Lehigh Valley Railroad Bridge to reach its car float operations at Greenville Yard on the Upper New York Bay.

The Point-No-Point Bridge's creosote-covered piers caught fire in 2000.

The lower  of the  Passaic River below the Dundee Dam is tidally influenced and navigable commercial maritime traffic upstream of the Point-No-Point Bridge is constricted by the width between its piers when the moveable span is open. Rules regulating the drawbridge operations determined by the US Coast Guard require 4 hours' notice for it to be swung open.

See also
List of bridges, tunnels, and cuts in Hudson County, New Jersey
Timeline of Jersey City, New Jersey-area railroads
List of crossings of the Lower Passaic River
Marion Junction (New Jersey)
Oak Island Yard

References

External links

Wikimapia
NJTV

Bridges over the Passaic River
Railroad bridges in New Jersey
Transportation in Newark, New Jersey
CSX Transportation bridges
Pennsylvania Railroad bridges
Conrail
Norfolk Southern Railway bridges
Swing bridges in the United States
Bridges in Hudson County, New Jersey
Kearny, New Jersey
1901 establishments in New Jersey